Blot is the fourth full-length album by the Norwegian Viking metal band Einherjer. It was released on 15 September 2003 by Tabu Recordings.

Track listing
 "Einherjermarsjen" – 1:38
 "Ironbound" – 3:41
 "Dead Knight's Rite" – 5:34
 "Wolf-Age" – 4:44
 "The Eternally Damned" – 3:01
 "Ware Her Venom" – 5:57
 "Hammar Haus" – 8:02
 "Starkad" – 4:19
 "Ride the Gallows" – 6:48
 "Ingen Grid" – 4:06
 "Berserkergang" – 5:55
 "Venomtongue" – 6:25

Credits
 Frode Glesnes - vocals, guitar
 Aksel Herløe - guitar, bass guitar
 Gerhard Storesund - drums & keyboard arrangements

References

Einherjer albums
2003 albums